Parides erithalion, the variable cattleheart, is a North and South American butterfly in the family Papilionidae. The species was first described by Jean Baptiste Boisduval in 1836.

Description
The upperside of the wings is black with a row of red postmedian spots. The underside of the wings is also black with a row of pink and whitish spots.

In males of some subspecies the uppersides of the forewings have a large olivaceous-green patch from the inner margin forward, with a creamy-white spot, while hindwings have a band of three red spots. Fringe in both sexes is dotted with white.

Subspecies
 P. e. erithalion (C. Colombia) 
 P. e. trichopus (Rothschild & Jordan, 1906) (Mexico)
 P. e. zeuxis (Lucas, 1852) (northern Venezuela)
 P. e. erlaces (Gray, 1853) (southern Peru, northern Bolivia, Paraguay, northern Argentina)
 P. e. polyzelus (C. Felder & R. Felder, 1865) (Mexico, Guatemala, El Salvador, Honduras) 
 P. e. lacydes (Hewitson, 1869) (eastern Ecuador)
 P. e. sadyattes (H. Druce, 1874) (Costa Rica)
 P. e. cauca (Oberthür, 1879) (western Colombia)
 P. e. xanthias (Rothschild & Jordan, 1906) (Peru)
 P. e. chinchipensis (Joicey & Talbot, 1918) (northern Peru)
 P. e. kruegeri (Niepelt, 1927) (southern Colombia)
 P. e. guillerminae Pischedda & Racheli, 1986 (northeastern Ecuador)
 P. e. yaminahua Pischedda & Racheli, 1987 (southern Peru)
 P. e. keithi Racheli, 1991 (southwestern Venezuela)
 P. e. palmasensis Brown, 1994 (western Ecuador)
 P. e. smalli Brown, 1994 (Honduras, Costa Rica, Panama)
 P. e. callegarii Racheli & Racheli, 1996 (Peru)
 P. e. inini Brévignon, 1998 (French Guiana)
 P. e. racheliorum Lamas, 1998 (Peru)
 P. e. blanca Racheli & Möhn, 2001 (Peru)
 P. e. browni Le Crom, Constantino & Salazar, 2002 (northeastern Colombia)
 P. e. chocoensis Constantino, Le Crom & Salazar, 2002 (western Colombia)

Description from Seitz

P. erithalion. Male: tibiae not thickened. Hindwing without distinct red spot behind the 2. median on the upper surface. Female: the spot before the 1. median of the forewing smaller than the preceding spot; band on the hindwing broad, pale on the innerside. Costa Rica to North Venezuela. — zeuxis Luc. (= rhameses Doubl., rhesus Koll., rhamases Fldr., abilius Fldr., rhamses Boisd.) (4a). Male: the green area much narrowed anteriorly, enclosing a large white spot before the 2. median; hindwing with 2 or 3 small red spots. Female: the posterior spot of the forewing larger than the preceding one. North Venezuela and eastern side of the Cordillera of Bogota. — erithalion Boisd. (4a) from Central Colombia (Rio Magdalena) has in the male rarely a white spot on the forewing, which is placed before the 1. median or between the radials. Female: the spot before the 1. median smaller than the preceding one; generally a few small spots outside the cell. — cauca Oberth. Male: the green area of the forewing wanting or merely indicated. Female: band on the hindwing narrow, curved, separated from the cell. Cauca valle — sadyattes Druce (4a). Male: the green area very variable, generally reduced, often wanting; all specimens with at least one white spot, which is placed before or behind the 3. radial, often a green spot in the cell. Female: band of the hindwing almost unicolorous bright red. Costa Rica to Panama.

Description from Rothschild and Jordan (1906)
A full description is provided by Walter Rothschild and Karl Jordan (1906). Note: Here polyzelus is treated as a full species and trichopus is P. z. trichopus.

Life cycle
The eggs are a brownish color. The caterpillar is brownish black with white and reddish-brown tubercles.

Host plants
The variable cattleheart feeds on Aristolochia cordiflora.

Status
It is common local species and not threatened.

Taxonomy

Parides erithalion is a member of the anchises species group

The members are
Parides anchises
Parides cutorina
Parides erithalion
Parides iphidamas
Parides panares
Parides phosphorus
Parides vertumnus

References

External links

"Parides erithalion polyzelus (C. Felder & R. Felder, 1865) (Variable Cattleheart) Immatures". Butterflies of America. Retrieved February 6, 2020.

"Parides erithalion (Boisduval, 1836)". Insecta.pro. Retrieved February 6, 2020.

erithalion
Butterflies of North America
Butterflies of Central America
Papilionidae of South America
Butterflies described in 1836